Sieges of Ciudad Rodrigo are a series of sieges of the Spanish town Ciudad Rodrigo.

Specific sieges are:
 Siege of Ciudad Rodrigo (1370)
 Siege of Ciudad Rodrigo (1707)
 Siege of Ciudad Rodrigo (1810)
 Siege of Ciudad Rodrigo (1812)

Ciudad Rodrigo
Former disambiguation pages converted to set index articles